Zihrun (sometimes also spelled Zahrun), is an uthra (angel or guardian) in the World of Light. He is the main subject of the Mandaean scroll Zihrun Raza Kasia.

The uthra Zhir (meaning 'secured') is often mentioned as part of a pair with Zihrun.

Zihrun is also a Mandaean male given name.

In Mandaean scriptures
Zihrun is mentioned in Right Ginza 4 as Zihrun-Uthra (also called Yusmir-Kana, with Kana meaning 'source' or 'place') and Right Ginza 8, and in Mandaean Book of John 62 as a "morning star."

Qolasta prayers 2, 3, 240, and 319 mention him as Zihrun Raza ("Zihrun the Mystery"). He is described as an uthra of radiance, light, and glory in Qolasta prayers 2 and 3, with prayer 2 mentioning Manda d-Hayyi as an emanation of Zihrun. Qolasta prayers 332, 340, 341, and 374 mention him as the name for a drabsha (banner), and prayer 347 mentions him as Zihrun-Šašlamiel.

See also
 List of angels in theology

References

Uthras
Mandaean given names
Masculine given names
Individual angels